Bridei son of Der-Ilei (died 706) was king of the Picts from 697 until 706. He became king when Taran was deposed in 697.

He was the brother of his successor Nechtan. It has been suggested that Bruide's father was Dargart mac Finguine (d. 686) of the Cenél Comgaill, a kingroup in Dál Riata who controlled Cowal and the Isle of Bute. The parentage of his mother, Der-Ilei, is not certainly known.

As well as Nechtan, a number of other brothers, half-brothers or foster-brothers of Bruide can be tentatively identified in the Irish annals: Talorgan son of Drest, Congus son of Dargart and Cináed son of Der-Ilei.

Bruide was one of many important men of Ireland and Scotland who guaranteed the Cáin Adomnáin (Lex Innocentium; Law of Innocents) at Birr in 697.

A battle between the Picts and Saxons in 698 in which Berhtred, son of Beornhaeth, was killed, is reported by the Irish chroniclers. A defeat of the Dál Riata is reported in 704, either at Loch Lomond or by the Leven, but it is more likely to have been at the hands of the Britons of Alt Clut than the Picts. Conflict in Skye in 701, where Conaing son of Dúnchad was killed, is most probably an internal conflict among the tribes of Dál Riata. It is reported in the Chronicon Scotorum that the winter of 700 was so cold that "the sea froze between Ireland and Scotland".

Bruide died in 706, when his death is recorded by the Annals of Ulster and the Annals of Tigernach. He was succeeded by his brother Nechtan.

Notes

References and further reading
 Anderson, Alan Orr, Early Sources of Scottish History A.D 500–1286, volume 1. Reprinted with corrections. Stamford: Paul Watkins, 1990. 
 Clancy, Thomas Owen, "Nechtan son of Derile"  in M. Lynch (ed.) The Oxford Companion to Scottish History. Oxford & New York: Oxford UP, 2002. 
 Clancy, Thomas Owen, "Philosopher-King : Nechtan mac Der-Ilei." Scottish Historical Review vol. 83, no. 2, pp. 125–149. Edinburgh: Edinburgh University Press, 2004. ISSN 0036-9241

External links
CELT: Corpus of Electronic Texts at University College Cork includes the Annals of Ulster, Tigernach, the Four Masters and Innisfallen, the Chronicon Scotorum, the Lebor Bretnach (which includes the Duan Albanach), Genealogies, and various Saints' Lives. Most are translated into English, or translations are in progress.
Pictish Chronicle
Cáin Adomnáin (translated by Kuno Meyer) at the Internet Medieval Sourcebook.

7th-century births
706 deaths
Pictish monarchs
7th-century Scottish monarchs
8th-century Scottish monarchs